Chakkar Pe Chakkar is a 1977 Bollywood romantic comedy film directed by Ashok Roy. The film stars Shashi Kapoor and Rekha.

Cast
Shashi Kapoor as Ravi Kumar 
Rekha as Shila Sahini 
Raza Murad as Mani Babu
Pran as Sher Singh
Madan Puri as Swami Hari Om
Lalita Pawar as Mrs Kumar
Bindu as Munnibai
Bhagwan Dada as Bhagwanbhai
G. Asrani as Murlidhar Mudaliar Rao
Amjad Khan as Avdhutt
Kumari Naaz as Mrs Babu
Ram Mohan as Daku
Rajan Haksar as Police Inspector
Sudhir as Sudhir

Music

External links
 

1977 films
1970s Hindi-language films
1977 romantic comedy films
Films scored by Kalyanji Anandji